Greatest Hits So Far may refer to:

 The Greatest Hits, So Far, an album by Public Image Ltd 1990 
 Greatest Hits... So Far!!! (Pink album), 2010
 Greatest Hits So Far... (Zac Brown Band album), 2014

See also
 List of "Greatest Hits" albums